The 200 metres straight is a track and field outdoor event of 200 metres on a straight track.

In the 1960s, the straight 200 metres was a separate world record event for men until IAAF deleted this variation from its list of official records.  The race was more common during the early to mid 20th century, when panhandle tracks, with 200 metre straightaways, were common.  The United States Olympic Trials held the event on a straight until 1932.

Interest in the event was revived around 2009. Several street events, primarily in Manchester, Brussels and Boston have constructed special tracks to hold the races, inviting elite sprinters.

Record progression

Men

Women

All-time top 25
h = hand timing
NWI = no wind measurement

Men

Notes
Below is a list of other times equal or superior to 20.71:
Steven Gardiner also ran 20.49 (2019).
Zharnel Hughes also ran 20.00 (2019).

Women
Correct as of June 2021.

Notes
Below is a list of other times equal or superior to 25.25:
Shaunae Miller-Uibo also ran 22.08 (2021).
Tynia Gaither also ran 22.96 (2021).
Anastasia Le-Roy also ran 23.12 (2019).
Shakima Wimbley also ran 23.40 (2019).

References

Events in track and field
Sprint (running)